Ramesh Chandappa Jigajinagi (born 28 June 1952) is an Indian politician from Karnataka and currently a member of Lok Sabha. He was Union Minister of State for Drinking Water and Sanitation in 2016. He was member of the Twelfth, Thirteenth, Fourteenth, Fifteenth and Sixteenth Lok Sabha. He was inducted into PM, Narendra Modi's government as a Minister of State for Drinking Water & Sanitation on July 5, 2016. He represents the Bijapur constituency (2019-2024) and is currently a member of the Bharatiya Janata Party which he joined in 2002. He has also been a member of Janata Dal and Ramakrishna Hegde's Vedike Party and Ram Vilas Paswan's Jan Shakti Party in 2001 when Hegde was planning to retire.

Political career
Ramesh Jigajinagi was born on 28 June 1952 in Atharga village of Bijapur District in Karnataka to Chandappa and Bhoramma Jigajinagi. He is married to Shoba and has two sons. He completed his graduation from BLDEA's New Arts College, Bijapur in the faculty of Arts and later earned his master's degree as well. Ramesh hails from a Scheduled Caste community and has been able to retain support in the areas of northern Karnataka, even after switching alliances and parties.
His electoral victory is significant, contesting and winning his seat against B. Shankaranand of the Indian National Congress'. Ramesh entered the 12th Lok Sabha with a margin of 1,31,238 votes.

Initially, he joined the undivided Janata Dal under the mentorship of Ramakrishna Hegde. He remained in the Janta Dal and was a staunch supporter of Ramakrishna Hegde. When Ramakrishna Hegde floated the Rashtreeya Nava Nirmana Vedike, Ramesh Jigajinagi was among the earliest sitting MLAs to support him and join the new party by resigning his ministership. Later, he joined Lok Shakti, a party formed by Ramakrishna Hegde and rejoined Janata Dal United after the merger of Lok Shakti with the former. After the death of his mentor, he joined the Bharatiya Janata Party.

Positions held
 Member of Karnataka Legislative Assembly 1983- 1985, 1985-1989, 1994-1999 (3 terms)
 Minister of State, Home Department in the Government of Karnataka 1983
 Minister of State, Excise Department in the Government of Karnataka 1984-1985
 Cabinet Minister for Social Welfare and Revenue in the Government of Karnataka 1996-1998
 Member of the 12th Loksabha 1998-1999 (Winning Margin=131238).  From Chikkodi.
 Member of the 13th Loksabha 1999-2004 (Winning Margin=84590)
 Member of the 14th Loksabha 2004-2009 (Winning Margin=43492),  for BJP.  
 Member of the 15th Loksabha 2009-2014 (Winning Margin=42404)  From Bijapur. 
 Member of the 16th Loksabha 2014- 2019    (Winning Margin=69819)
 Member of the 17th Loksabha 2019 - (Winning Margin = 2,58,038)
 He has served as the member in the following committees
 Parliamentary Consultative Committee, Ministry of Finance
 Parliamentary  Committee on Absence of Members from the sittings of the House
 Parliamentary  Committee on Commerce
 Parliamentary Committee on Home Affairs and its Sub-Committee on Personnel Policy of       Central Para-Military Forces
 Union Minister of State for Drinking Water & Sanitation 2016

See also
 Members of Fourteenth Lok Sabha

Notes

External links
 Ramesh Jigajinagi's home page on Lok Sabha's Website

References 

1952 births
Bharatiya Janata Party politicians from Karnataka
Living people
India MPs 1998–1999
India MPs 1999–2004
India MPs 2004–2009
India MPs 2009–2014
People from Bijapur district, Karnataka
Lok Sabha members from Karnataka
India MPs 2014–2019
Janata Dal politicians
Janata Dal (United) politicians
Lok Janshakti Party politicians
Narendra Modi ministry
India MPs 2019–present
Lok Shakti politicians